Roar or Roari was a Danish man in Gesta Danorum. He helped raise Prince Gram and trained him in swordsmanship. He later married his daughter to him. However, this marriage ended when Gram grew tired of his wife and arranged her marriage to his retainer, Bess.

The text

References


Legendary Norsemen
Danish chronicles